Metroland is an English novel written by Julian Barnes and published in 1980, the author's first book.

Overview
Metroland is a first person account of Christopher Lloyd and his experiences growing up in the suburbs of London (so-called Metro-land), his brief life in Paris as a graduate student and the early years of his subsequent marriage. It is divided into three sections: I Metroland (1963); II Paris (1968); and III Metroland (1977). As adolescents Christopher and his childhood friend Toni had shown contempt for the bourgeois establishment but this lifestyle is one that Christopher ultimately chooses, much to Toni's disappointment, obtaining a secure job in publishing, marrying, buying a house and having a child. Christopher realises that his normal life and somewhat mundane marriage are not perfect, nor are they necessarily more exciting than his time in Paris with his bold French girlfriend Annick, but he does love his wife and is content.

Reception
Philip Larkin wrote a letter to Barnes. Barnes later recounted that Larkin had written "that he had much enjoyed it, despite his prejudice against novels with people under the age of 21 in them. He added, gloomily, something like, 'but is that what life's like nowadays?' This unexpected praise was the most gratifying moment of the strange passage of first publication." Barnes' mother complained about the book's "bombardment" of filth.

Film adaptation

In 1997 Metroland was made into a film starring Christian Bale and Emily Watson, with a score by Mark Knopfler. The executive producer was Andrew Bandall and the director was Philip Saville.

References

1980 British novels
British bildungsromans
Novels about cities
Novels by Julian Barnes
Novels set on the London Underground
Jonathan Cape books
British novels adapted into films
1980 debut novels